Carole Martinez (10 November 1966 in Créhange) is a French contemporary novelist.

Biography 
She was at a time tempted by theater and created her troupe at age 20.

She is a teacher of French.

Her first novel, released discreetly in February 2007, received thereafter numerous prizes. Her second novel, is short listed for the prix Goncourt (the prize eventually went to L'Art français de la guerre by Alexis Jenni with five votes, and three to Carole Martinez.) She finally was awarded the prix Goncourt des lycéens.

Publications 
 Youth
1998: Le Cri du livre, Paris, Pocket, series "Jeunesse", 175 p. . Reissued under the title L'Œil du témoin, Paris, éditions Rageot, series "Heure noire", 2011, 192 p. 
 Novels
2007: Le Cœur cousu, Paris, éditions Gallimard, Collection Blanche, 430 p. 
 Prix Renaudot des lycéens 2007
 Prix Ulysse 2007
 Prix Emmanuel Roblès 2007
 Premier prix du Festival du Premier Roman de Chambéry - 2007
 Bourse de la Découverte - Prix Découverte Prince Pierre de Monaco 2007
 Bourse Thyde Monnier 2007
 Prix des lycéens de Monaco
2011: Du domaine des Murmures, Paris, éditions Gallimard, Collection Blanche, 208 p. 
 Prix Goncourt des lycéens 2011.
 Prix Marcel-Aymé 2012.
2015: La terre qui penche, éditions Gallimard, Collection Blanche, Feuille d'or de la ville de Nancy.

References

External links 
 Carole Martinez on Babelio
 La terre qui penche, de Carole Martinez : un pur joyau on L'Express (5 October 2015)
 Carole Martinez, le retour on L'Obs (27 July 2011)
 Rentrée littéraire : Carole Martinez en équilibre on Le Point (12 August 2015)
 Carole Martinez on Gallimard
 Carole Martinez, conteuse au fil d’or on ''La Croix (15 August 2012)
 Carole Martinez - La terre qui penche on YouTube 

21st-century French women writers
French children's writers
French women children's writers
21st-century French non-fiction writers
Prix Goncourt des lycéens winners
Prix Emmanuel Roblès recipients
People from Moselle (department)
1966 births
Living people
Prix Renaudot des lycéens winners